In matrix theory, Sylvester's determinant identity is an identity useful for evaluating certain types of determinants. It is named after James Joseph Sylvester, who stated this identity without proof in 1851.

Given an n-by-n  matrix , let  denote its determinant.  Choose a pair  

Define the auxiliary m-by-m matrix  whose elements are equal to the following determinants

Then the following is Sylvester's determinantal identity (Sylvester, 1851):

When m = 2, this is the Desnanot-Jacobi identity (Jacobi, 1851).

See also
 Weinstein–Aronszajn identity, which is sometimes attributed to Sylvester

References

Determinants
Matrix theory
Theorems in linear algebra